Tim Wilkison was the defending champion but did not compete that year.

Jan Gunnarsson won in the final 6–7, 6–2, 6–4, 1–6, 7–5 against Libor Pimek.

Seeds

  Anders Järryd (second round)
  Martín Jaite (quarterfinals)
  Heinz Günthardt (semifinals)
  Sergio Casal (second round)
  Jan Gunnarsson (champion)
  Andreas Maurer (semifinals)
  Libor Pimek (final)
  Ronald Agénor (quarterfinals)

Draw

Final

Section 1

Section 2

External links
 1985 Fischer-Grand Prix Draw

Singles